Jessica Bell is a Canadian politician who has represented University—Rosedale in the Legislative Assembly of Ontario since 2018, as a member of the Ontario New Democratic Party (NDP).

Bell is as the Opposition Transit Critic in the legislature. Prior to being elected, she was the founding executive director of TTCriders, an advocacy group campaigning for improvements to the Toronto Transit Commission. She has a long history of community organizing and grassroots activism.

Bell has also been a lecturer at Toronto Metropolitan University, and director of the California Food & Justice Coalition.

Politics
In 2018 Bell was named the ONDP's critic for transit. After the 2022 Ontario general election her critic portfolio changed to housing.

Electoral record

References

21st-century Canadian politicians
21st-century Canadian women politicians
Australian emigrants to Canada
Living people
Ontario New Democratic Party MPPs
Politicians from Melbourne
Politicians from Toronto
Women MPPs in Ontario
Year of birth missing (living people)